Hook Wood is a Site of Special Scientific Interest (or SSSI) in Pembrokeshire, South Wales. In 1603 George Owen described Hook Wood as one of “the best standing woods” of Pembrokeshire. It has been designated as a Site of Special Scientific Interest since January 1986 in an attempt to protect its fragile biological elements. The site has an area of 12.02 hectares and is managed by Natural Resources Wales. SSSIs in Wales have been notified of a total of 142 different animal species and 191 different plant species.

Type and features
This is an ancient estuarine woodland of sessile oak Quercus petraea on the steep outer banks of the Western Cleddau estuary. More than 130 plants have been recorded, and this site is one of the most diverse of the oakwoods on the rocky shorelines of Milford Haven.

The woodland canopy is predominantly coppice of sessile oak which varies from about 15 metres on the upper slope to around 4 metres on the low cliffs below. A detailed estate map by Thomas Lewis in 1776, shows that the extent of the wood since that time has been kept.

See also
List of Sites of Special Scientific Interest in Pembrokeshire

References

External links
Natural Resources Wales website

Sites of Special Scientific Interest in Pembrokeshire
Sites of Special Scientific Interest notified in 1986